{{Infobox film
| name           = Breaking In
| image          = Breaking in poster.jpg
| image_size     =
| caption        = Original release poster
| director       = Bill Forsyth
| producer       = Harry Gittes
| writer         = John Sayles
| starring       = 
| music          = Michael Gibbs
| cinematography = Michael Coulter
| editing        = Michael Ellis
| studio         = Act III Communications
| distributor    = The Samuel Goldwyn Company
| released       = 
| runtime        = 94 minutes
| country        = United States
| language       = English
| budget         = $5.5 million
| gross          = $1.9 million<ref name="sayles">Gerry Molyneaux, "John Sayles, Renaissance Books, 2000 p 182</ref>
}}Breaking In is a 1989 American crime comedy film directed by Bill Forsyth, written by John Sayles, and starring Burt Reynolds, Casey Siemaszko and Lorraine Toussaint. The film follows professional small-time criminals as they live and practice their trades.

Plot

Ernie Mullins (Burt Reynolds) is New York's 61-year-old-pro safecracker, who is operating now in Portland, Oregon. Mike (Casey Siemaszko), is the "nosy, amiable kid" that Ernie takes on as his lookout and apprentice after they encounter each other (Ernie tried robbing the safe while Mike broke in just to enjoy some of the comforts of the house). The two engage in a few heists together, such as one involving a supermarket and a friendly dog and a Fourth of July robbery of an amusement park during a fireworks show. Ernie is content to live in a tract home on the fringe of the city, but Mike can't resist using his newfound money for material items, and his firing from the mechanic shop only serves to drive a wedge between the two.

Ernie maintains a steady, paying relationship with a prostitute, Delphine (Lorraine Toussaint), who fixes Mike up with her apprentice, Carrie (Sheila Kelley). Their relationship does not last long, however, as Mike's desire for her to not need to use her body for money lead her to leave him. The film also features a pair of retired crooks, Ernie's card-playing pals, Johnny (Albert Salmi) and Shoes (Harry Carey), and a pair of adversarial lawyers (Maury Chaykin and Stephen Tobolowsky).

Mike's newfound wealth perks the suspicions of the authorities, and he has to try to not turn in Ernie in order to get a lighter sentence. Instead, he admits to his crimes alongside ones that Ernie did, which garners him a nine-year sentence but keeps his friendship with Ernie intact.

Cast

Production
The film was shot in Portland, Oregon. Forsyth envisioned John Mahoney for the lead role, but Act III Productions wanted a higher profile name. Jack Nicholson and Paul Newman were each offered the role, but declined. Prompted to have a star, Reynolds was eventually asked to do the film. It was Reynolds' first character role. "I've spent an entire career... making the characters me," he said." This is the first time I've done it the other way around."

Reynolds worked for SAG scale because he was an admirer of the script and of Forsyth. John Sayles normally directed his own scripts but did not do this one because he did not feel he had the sense of humor to bring it off.

Forsyth too, normally directed his own scripts, but took on Breaking In in an attempt to make contact with a larger mainstream audience:
I can't get away with making $6- or $7-million movies (e.g., "Local Hero" and "Housekeeping") with the kind of audience that my past movies have reached. I've just got to find an audience-or retreat. And I'm quite happy to retreat, I'm happy to go back to Scotland and make smaller movies"-e.g., "Gregory's Girl." "But at the same time, `Breaking In' seemed a comfortable experiment for me. Because although I say I'm trying to reach that audience or see how far that audience is from me, I don't think I'm going that far to get them. . . . You could read (the "Breaking In" script) very innocently as a kind of nice caper with nice characters. But underneath that there is so much compromise and so much duplicity and so much blackmail going on that it seemed to have lots of levels I could work on.

He later described it as "an awkward little movie. It’s not an American film and it’s not a European film; it’s ungraspable what it is."

Reception
Box office
The film was not a commercial success. After closing out the 27th New York Film Festival in 1989, it opened in 400 theaters at #12 in its opening weekend (10/13–15) with $679,200, but returned less than $2 million in total box office receipts.

Critical response
Critically, the film was favorably received. Vincent Canby of The New York Times'' wrote that the film had "a lot of the appeal of a 1949 Oldsmobile convertible that still looks almost new and drives like a dream, if none too fast. Speed is not of the essence here...Mr. Reynolds has not appeared more fit - nor has he given a more accomplished performance - in a very long time."

Roger Ebert called the film "a well-written, well-directed picture. Reynolds has a comfortable screen presence and can act…he shows the warmth and quirkiness that made him fun to watch in the first place."

Decades later, Reynolds biographer Wayne Byrne praised the film as "a quiet, beautiful piece of work, one of the most understated and underrated in the Reynolds catalogue."

On Rotten Tomatoes, the film has a rating of 82% based on reviews from 11 critics.

References

External links
 
 
 

1989 films
1980s crime comedy films
American crime comedy films
1980s English-language films
Films directed by Bill Forsyth
Films set in Portland, Oregon
Films shot in Portland, Oregon
American independent films
Films with screenplays by John Sayles
The Samuel Goldwyn Company films
1989 comedy films
1980s American films